Dasque is a surname. Notable people with the surname include:

 Jean Dasque (1919–2013), French film director
 Juan Carlos Dasque (born 1952), Argentine sport shooter